Scattergood Meets Broadway is a 1941 American comedy film directed by Christy Cabanne and written by Michael L. Simmons and Ethel B. Stone. It is the sequel to the 1941 film Scattergood Pulls the Strings. The film stars Guy Kibbee, Mildred Coles, William "Bill" Henry, Emma Dunn, Frank Jenks, Joyce Compton and Bradley Page. The film was released on August 22, 1941, by RKO Pictures.

Plot
Scattergood loans some money to his neighbor, Elly Drew,  who was going to sell her home in order to support her son David, an aspiring playwright who is in New York City trying to get his play produced. He also decides to go visit New York to see how David was doing and finds out finds out that things aren't quite as rosy as they seem.

Cast 
Guy Kibbee as Scattergood Baines
Mildred Coles as Peggy Gibson
William "Bill" Henry as David Drew
Emma Dunn as Mirandy Baines
Frank Jenks as J. J. Bent
Joyce Compton as Diana Deane
Bradley Page as H. C. Bard
Chester Clute as Quentin Van Deusen
Morgan Wallace as Reynolds
Carl Stockdale as Squire Pettibone
Charlotte Walker as Elly Drew
Paul White as Hipp
Don Brodie as Waiter
Herbert Rawlinson as The Governor

References

External links 
 

1941 films
American black-and-white films
Films scored by Dimitri Tiomkin
Films directed by Christy Cabanne
American sequel films
American comedy films
1941 comedy films
RKO Pictures films
1940s English-language films
1940s American films